Bungisngis is a one-eyed giant in Philippine folklore. This giant, purported to dwell in Meluz, Orion, Bataan, and Cebu is described as always laughing. The literal meaning of the name Bungingis is derived from the Cebuano word ngisi which means "to giggle".

The Bungisngis is humanoid giant with large teeth that are always showing. It displays tremendous strength, which is stated in the Filipino tale "The Three Friends – The Monkey, The Dog and The Carabao," the giant is able to lift the carabao and throw it with such force that it ends knee-deep in the ground, as well as killing the dog. However, despite its strength, the Bungisngis is easily outwitted and quickly panics. In the tale of the Three Friends, Monkey's tricks lead it to its death, by convincing the creature to wear a belt, which is actually a boa constrictor.

Bungisngis is similar the Cyclopes in Greek Mythology. Bungisngis bears only one eye, which can be found in its forehead, but this is compensated for by its strong sense of hearing. It also has an upper lip large enough to cover its face when thrown back.

References

Visayan mythology
Philippine demons